The following schools are officially called Ocean View Elementary School.  Often they are unofficially and incorrectly shown as "Oceanview" instead of the correct "Ocean View" (with a space).

United States:
California
Ocean View Elementary School teaches K to 5 in Albany, Alameda County
Ocean View Elementary School teaches K to 6 in Arroyo Grande, San Luis Obispo County 
Ocean View Elementary School teaches K to 5 in Whittier, Los Angeles County 
Virginia
Ocean View Elementary School teaches Pre-K to 5 in Norfolk
Alaska
Ocean View Elementary School teaches K to 6 in Anchorage 
Canada:
Nova Scotia
Ocean View Elementary School teaches K to 4 in Eastern Passage